Sergio Sebastiani (born 11 April 1931) is an Italian prelate of the Catholic Church who was head of the Prefecture for the Economic Affairs of the Holy See from 1997 to 2008. He was made a cardinal in 2001. From 1960 to 1994 he worked in the diplomatic service of the Holy See, becoming an archbishop and apostolic nuncio in 1976 and leading the offices representing the Vatican in Madagascar, Mauritius, and Turkey.

Biography
Sebastiani was born in Montemonaco, Italy. He studied at the Episcopal Seminary of Ascoli Piceno and later at the Archiepiscopal Seminary of Fermo. He continued his studies at the Pontifical Gregorian University in Rome where he earned his licentiate in theology and at the Pontifical Lateran University where he was awarded a doctorate in canon law. He was ordained on 15 July 1956 in Fermo. After this he studied in Rome until 1960.

He served as secretary of nunciature in Perú, 1960–1962; in nunciature in Brazil 1962–1966; auditor in nunciature in Chile, 1966–1967. He was recalled to the Vatican as secretary of Cardinal Cicognani and subsequently Cardinal Villot during their terms as secretaries of State, and later a head of the secretariat of the Sostituto, 1967–1974. The decision was taken to appoint him to the rank of Counselor of nunciature in France with special charge before the Council of Europe, 1974–1976. He was created Prelate of honour on 30 April 1974.

On 27 September 1976, Pope Paul VI appointed him Titular Archbishop of Caesarea in Mauretania and Apostolic Pro-Nuncio to Madagascar. He added Apostolic Pro-Nuncio to Mauritius on 24 November. Sebastiani became Apostolic Pro-Nuncio to Turkey on 8 January 1985. In 1994, he was appointed General Secretary of the Central Committee for the Great Jubilee of the Year 2000. From 2 May 1996 to 3 November 1997, he was president of Peregrinatio ad Petri Sedem, the Vatican agency that promotes and supports pilgrims on their visits to Rome.

In 1997, Sebastiani was made President of the Prefecture for the Economic Affairs of the Holy See, part of the Roman Curia, responsible for auditing the temporal possessions of the Holy See. He served in this position until his resignation on 12 April 2008. Pope Benedict XVI named Velasio De Paolis as Sebastiani's successor.

Sebastiani was created Cardinal-Deacon of S. Eustachio on 21 February 2001, and was one of the cardinal electors who participated in the 2005 papal conclave that selected Pope Benedict XVI. On 21 February 2011, he opted for the order of Cardinal Priest, with his former diaconal church elevated to the level of cardinalitial title.

Sebastiani is the spiritual guide and protector of an organization that styles itself the Sovereign Hospitaller Order of Saint John of Jerusalem, Knights of Malta, one of many private organizations mimicking the Sovereign Military Order of Malta.

Notes

References

External links

 
Profile of Sergio Sebastiani on Catholic Hierarchy
Profile in Salvador Miranda's biographical dictionary
Profile on GCatholic.org

1931 births
Living people
People from the Province of Ascoli Piceno
21st-century Italian cardinals
Apostolic Nuncios to Madagascar
Apostolic Nuncios to Mauritius
Apostolic Nuncios to Turkey
Economic history of the Holy See
Almo Collegio Capranica alumni
Pontifical Ecclesiastical Academy alumni
Members of the Apostolic Signatura
Cardinals created by Pope John Paul II
Pontifical Gregorian University alumni
Pontifical Lateran University alumni